Arrosès is a commune in the Pyrénées-Atlantiques department in the Nouvelle-Aquitaine region of south-western France.

Geography
Arrosès is located some 50 km south-east of Hagetmau and some 5 km west of Madiran with the eastern border of the commune being the border between Pyrénées-Atlantiques and Hautes-Pyrénées departments. Access to the commune is by the D219 road from Aurions-Idernes in the west passing through the commune north of the village then continuing east to Madiran as the D66. The D292 comes from Aubous in the north passing through the commune and the village and continuing south to join the D139 south of Crouseilles. The commune is mostly farmland  with patches of forest scattered throughout.

The commune is located in the Drainage basin of the Adour with several streams rising in the commune and flowing east to join the Saget which flows north to join the Adour near Saint-Mont and forming most of the eastern border of the commune. The Larcis forms most of the western border of the commune as it flows north to join the Lees.

Places and Hamlets

 Auvian
 Baradat
 Barbau
 Baylou
 Bigarat
 Bouézou
 Bousigué
 Bouziquet
 Cantounet
 Couet
 Crecq
 Ducos
 Duliès
 Flandres
 Grange
 Haget
 Hourat
 Jouet
 Lasgrabes
 Laudique
 Lavielle
 Mombet
 Mondain
 La Mothe
 Paris
 Peyret
 Raguet
 Regard
 Ribès
 Sassié
 Tapounet
 Tillet

Neighbouring communes and villages

Toponymy
The commune name in béarnais is Arrosés.

Michel Grosclaude proposed as its etymology the anthroponym Arrosés which was very common in the Pyrenees and the Iberian peninsula and well attested in the Middle Ages.

The following table details the origins of the commune name and other names in the commune.

Sources:

Raymond: Topographic Dictionary of the Department of Basses-Pyrenees, 1863, on the page numbers indicated in the table. 
Grosclaude: Toponymic Dictionary of communes, Béarn, 2006 
Cassini: Cassini Map from 1750
Ldh/EHESS/Cassini: 

Origins:
Census: Census of Béarn
Affièvement: Titles of affièvement of Arrosès
Establishments: Register of Establishments of Béarn
Reformation: Reformation of Béarn
Terrier: Terrier of Arrosès.

History
Paul Raymond noted  on page 13 of his 1863 dictionary that in 1385, Arrosès had 31 fires and depended on the bailiwick of Lembeye. There was a Tithe in Arrosès parish called Sainte-Rose.

Administration

List of Successive Mayors

Inter-communality
The commune is part of five inter-communal structures:
 the Communauté de communes du Nord-Est Béarn;
 the highways SIVU of the Canton of Lembeye
 the AEP association of Crouseilles;
 the SIVU for educational regrouping in Aurions-idernes, Arrosès, Séméacq-Blachon, and Moncaup;
 the Energy association of Pyrénées-Atlantiques;

Demography
In 2017 the commune had 139 inhabitants.

Economy
The town is part of the Appellation d'origine contrôlée (AOC) zones of Madiran, Pacherenc-du-vic-bilh, and Béarn AOC.

Culture and Heritage

Civil heritage
A number of structures have been identified as historical monuments. These are:
A Fortified complex (Motte-and-bailey castle, courtyard, house) indicates the presence of a lordship in the 11th century.
Of 50 Houses and Farms surveyed by the Ministry of Culture, 25 were built prior to 1871.
The Chateau of Sauvernéa at a place called Mombet is a notable house built in the 18th century. Other objects at Mombet are:
A Tombstone dated 1762.
A sideboard (18th century)
A weathervane (18th century)
A Farm at a place called Flandres from 1746.

A Hilarri located at a house in the Bouézou area dates to the 17th century. It came from the old church which is now destroyed.

Religious heritage

The Church of Our Lady of the Assumption partially dates to the 12th century. It contains many items which have been registered. These are:

Front of the Altar (19th century)
Processional Cross (17th or 18th century)
Stations of the Cross (19th century)
Altar candlestick (19th century)
Processional Banner (19th century)
Lectern (18th century)
Pulpit (18th century)
Tenebrae candlestick (18th century (?))
Stoup (2) (12th or 13th century)
Stoup (1) (15th or 16th century)
Baptismal font (12th and 17th centuries)
Confessional (18th century)
Statue: Saint Rose (18th century)
Retable of Saint Rose (18th century)
Altar, 2 altar steps, tabernacle, Retable, Painting (18th-19th centuries)
Altar Cross (19th century)
Painting: Assumption (18th century)
4 Statues (18th century)
Retable (18th century)
6 Statues (18th century (?))
Tabernacle, exhibit (18th century (?))
Altar (18th century)
Ensemble of the Virgin (18th-19th centuries)
Panelling on the surfaces (18th century)

See also
Communes of the Pyrénées-Atlantiques department

References

External links
Rosés on the 1750 Cassini Map

Communes of Pyrénées-Atlantiques